Yeliz Özel (born 6 March 1980, in Ankara) is a Turkish handballer, who plays for İzmir Büyükşehir Belediyesi GSK and the Turkish national team. She is widely considered best handball player ever from Turkey.

Playing career

Club
She started her career in Ankara team PTT, played first European Cup level matches same year. With outstanding skills in game-reading, Yeliz labelled as a 'prominent young talent' by several handball experts. She transferred to Norway League for Byåsen HE in Trondheim, played there one full season. Then she back to Turkey to play in Eskisehir Anadolu University and Uskudar Belediyesi SK.

In 2004, Yeliz went to Skopje to playing for Kometal Gjorče Petrov Skopje. After a brilliant stint there, she was one of the best players of EHF Champions League 2004–05 season. She scored 61 goals and made a huge contribution to promote her team final.

In June 2010, Yeliz Özel signed for Romania's top club CS Oltchim Râmnicu Vâlcea. Played two season in Romania, then she returned again to her home country back.

Özel returned home in June 2012 to rejoin her former team Üsküdar Belediyespor. After one season, she transferred to the Ankara-based team Yenimahalle Bld. SK.

International
Özel was a member of the Turkey women's national handball team, and served as their captain. She was part of the team, which won the silver medal at the 2009 Mediterranean Games held in Pescara, Italy.

Honours 
Turkish Women's Handball Super League
 Winners (5): 2003–04, 2007–08,  2008–09,  2009–10,  2014–15
 Runners-up (2):  2012–13, 2013–14

Women's EHF Champions League
 Runner-up (1): 2004–05

Handball at the Mediterranean Games
 Runner-up (1): 2009

References

External links

 EHF profile

1980 births
Living people
Sportspeople from Ankara
Turkish female handball players
Expatriate handball players
Turkish expatriate sportspeople in Norway
Turkish expatriate sportspeople in Romania
Turkish expatriate sportspeople in North Macedonia
SCM Râmnicu Vâlcea (handball) players
Üsküdar Belediyespor players
Yenimahalle Bld. SK (women's handball) players
Mediterranean Games silver medalists for Turkey
Competitors at the 2005 Mediterranean Games
Competitors at the 2009 Mediterranean Games
Mediterranean Games medalists in handball
21st-century Turkish sportswomen